Macna ignebasalis is a species of snout moth in the genus Macna. It was described by George Hampson in 1897. It is found in New Guinea.

References

Moths described in 1897
Pyralini